Hungary competed at the 2004 Summer Olympics in Athens, Greece, from 13 to 29 August 2004. Hungarian athletes have competed at every Summer Olympic Games in the modern era, except the 1920 Summer Olympics in Antwerp, and the 1984 Summer Olympics in Los Angeles because of the Soviet boycott. The Hungarian Olympic Committee (MOB) sent a total of 209 athletes to the Games, 119 men and 90 women, to compete in 20 sports. Water polo and handball were the only team-based sports in which Hungary had its representation in these Olympic Games. There was only a single competitor in road cycling and mountain biking.

The Hungarian team featured several Olympic medalists from Sydney, including the men's water polo team (led by Tibor Benedek), épée fencer Tímea Nagy, sprint kayakers Zoltán Kammerer, György Kolonics (who later died in 2008 due to heart failure), and Katalin Kovács, and breaststroke and medley swimmer Ágnes Kovács. Table tennis player Csilla Bátorfi became the first female Hungarian athlete to compete in five Olympic Games as one of the most sophisticated members of the team. Along with Kolonics and Benedek, six Hungarian athletes had made their fourth Olympic appearance, including fencer Iván Kovács and half-heavyweight judoka Antal Kovács, who was assigned by the committee to become the nation's flag bearer in the opening ceremony. Race walker Zoltán Czukor, aged 41, was the oldest member of the team, while backstroke swimmer Evelyn Verrasztó was the youngest at age 15.

Hungary left Athens with a total of 17 Olympic medals, 8 golds, 6 silver, and 3 bronze, matching its overall tally with Sydney four years earlier. Almost a third of these medals were awarded to the athletes in sprint canoeing, three in fencing, and two in swimming. Skeet shooter Diána Igaly and modern pentathlete Zsuzsanna Vörös won Olympic gold medals for the first time in their respective sporting events by a female. Meanwhile, Nagy managed to repeat her gold from Sydney in women's épée fencing. Hungary's team-based athletes proved particularly successful in Athens, as the men's water polo team had fulfilled a mission to defend their eighth overall Olympic title.

Originally, Hungary had won 20 Olympic medals at these Games. Four Hungarian medalists had been disqualified from the Games for committing an anti-doping violation, two of which were Olympic champions in track and field. On August 25, 2004, discus thrower Róbert Fazekas failed to submit a proper urine sample during the test, and was not allowed to present his gold in the medal ceremony. At the conclusion of the Games, the International Olympic Committee decided to strip off Adrián Annus' gold medal in men's hammer throw for failing to show up in the doping test.

Medalists

| width=78% align=left valign=top |

| width=22% align=left valign=top |

Athletics

Hungarian athletes have so far achieved qualifying standards in the following athletics events (up to a maximum of 3 athletes in each event at the 'A' Standard, and 1 at the 'B' Standard).

Róbert Fazekas and Adrián Annus originally claimed gold medals in both men's discus and hammer throw. On August 25, 2004, a few hours before the medal ceremony had taken place, Fazekas committed an anti-doping violation by failing to submit a proper urine sample during the test, and was eventually expelled from the Games. Meanwhile, at the conclusion of the Games, the International Olympic Committee stripped off Annus' Olympic title after failing the doping test.

Men
Track & road events

Field events

Combined events – Decathlon

Women
Track & road events

Field events

Boxing

Hungary sent five boxers to Athens. In the first round, two were defeated while two advanced by winning and a third received a bye.  All three that advanced lost in the round of 16.

Canoeing

Sprint
Men

Women

Qualification Legend: Q = Qualify to final; q = Qualify to semifinal

Cycling

Road

Mountain biking

Diving 

Hungarian divers qualified for three individual spots at the 2004 Olympic Games.

Men

Women

Fencing

Men

Women

Gymnastics

Artistic
Men

Women

Handball

Men's tournament

Roster

Group play

Quarterfinal

Semifinal

Bronze Medal Final

Women's tournament

Roster

Group play

Quarterfinal

5th-8th Place Semifinal

Fifth Place Final

Judo

Two Hungarian judoka qualified for the 2004 Summer Olympics.

Modern pentathlon

Four Hungarian athletes qualified to compete in the modern pentathlon event through the European and UIPM World Championships.

Rowing

Hungarian rowers qualified the following boats:

Men

Women

Qualification Legend: FA=Final A (medal); FB=Final B (non-medal); FC=Final C (non-medal); FD=Final D (non-medal); FE=Final E (non-medal); FF=Final F (non-medal); SA/B=Semifinals A/B; SC/D=Semifinals C/D; SE/F=Semifinals E/F; R=Repechage

Sailing

Hungarian sailors have qualified one boat for each of the following events.

Men

Women

M = Medal race; OCS = On course side of the starting line; DSQ = Disqualified; DNF = Did not finish; DNS= Did not start; RDG = Redress given

Shooting 

Eight Hungarian shooters (three men and five women) qualified to compete in the following events:

Men

Women

Swimming 

Hungarian swimmers earned qualifying standards in the following events (up to a maximum of 2 swimmers in each event at the A-standard time, and 1 at the B-standard time):

Men

Women

Table tennis

Three Hungarian table tennis players qualified for the following events.

Tennis

Hungary nominated four female tennis players to compete in the tournament.

Triathlon

Two Hungarian triathletes qualified for the following events.

Water polo

Men's tournament

Roster

Group play

Semifinal

Gold Medal Final

 Won Gold Medal

Women's tournament

Roster

Group play

Quarterfinal

Fifth-Sixth Place Final

Weightlifting 

Seven Hungarian weightlifters qualified for the following events: Ferenc Gyurkovics, along with Zoltán Kovács, originally claimed the silver in men's 105 kg class, but the International Olympic Committee decided to strip of his medal after he was tested positive for oxandrolone and anabolic steroids.

Men

Women

Wrestling 

Men's freestyle

Men's Greco-Roman

See also
 Hungary at the 2004 Summer Paralympics

References

External links
Official Report of the XXVIII Olympiad
Hungarian Olympic Committee 

Nations at the 2004 Summer Olympics
2004
Summer Olympics